Callitula is a genus of insects belonging to the family Pteromalidae.

The genus was first described by Spinola in 1811.

The genus has cosmopolitan distribution.

Species:
 Callitula pyrrhogaster (Walker, 1833)

References

Pteromalidae
Hymenoptera genera